The Battle of Keramaia was a major Byzantine naval victory over the Egyptian fleet of the Umayyad Caliphate at Cyprus in 746.

Battle
The battle is mentioned by the Byzantine historians Theophanes the Confessor, Patriarch Nikephoros I of Constantinople, and Anastasius Bibliothecarius. According to the sources, the Egyptian fleet sailed from Alexandria to Cyprus. The Byzantine strategos of the Cibyrrhaeots managed to surprise the Arabs and blockade the entrance of the harbour of Keramaia. As a result, almost the entire Arab fleet—Theophanes writes, with obvious exaggeration, of a thousand dromons, while Anastasius gives the more plausible number of thirty vessels —was destroyed. According to Theophanes, "it is said that only three ships escaped".

Aftermath
This crushing defeat was a signal event: in its aftermath, the Egyptian fleets are not mentioned until the second half of the 9th century, following the Sack of Damietta. Beginning with E. W. Brooks, several scholars assumed that during this entire period, there was no Egyptian navy to speak of. This is incorrect, as Arabic and Coptic sources clearly mention the presence of an arsenal at Fustat and naval activity in Egypt throughout the period, but Egypt ceased to be a major base for naval expeditions against Byzantium during the century after Keramaia.

References

Sources

Keramaia
740s in the Byzantine Empire
746
Medieval Cyprus
Keramaia
Keramaia
Keramaia
Keramaia
740s in the Umayyad Caliphate